Jeff Kline is an American film and television writer-producer and former television executive. He has been involved in more than 40 animated and live-action series and pilots, has received multiple Emmy nominations and wins.

Early life
Jeff Kline was born in Boston, Massachusetts. Kline graduated from Boston University's College of Communication in 1987.

Career 
After graduating from Boston University, Kline interned at Roger Corman's Concorde/New Horizons and worked in feature development for Michael Shamberg and Harold Ramis's Ocean Pictures. He served as a television executive in Daytime Programming at NBC Entertainment for one year then spent five years at Columbia Pictures Television, eventually serving as the senior vice president of drama before transitioning into writing/producing at the suggestion of his first writing partner, Frank Lupo, co-creator of The A-Team and Wiseguy.

Between 1995 and 2006, he developed and/or produced the series: My Friends Tigger & Pooh (Playhouse Disney); Jackie Chan Adventures (Kids' WB); Dragon Tales (PBS); Stuart Little: The Animated Series (HBO); That Was Then (ABC); Harold and the Purple Crayon (HBO); Max Steel (Kids WB); Men in Black: The Animated Series (Kids WB); Big Guy and Rusty the Boy Robot (FOX); Roughnecks: Starship Troopers Chronicles (BKN); Godzilla: The Series (FOX); Channel Umptee-3 (Kids WB); Extreme Ghostbusters (BKN); and Jumanji (UPN).

From 2006 to 2008 he was a consulting producer for Cartoon Network's Banana Splits revival, wrote a Paris Hilton pilot for MTV, and co-wrote the feature film The Rosenbergs Save Christmas (with Goldie Hawn attached to star) for Fox Searchlight.

In 2009 he taught as an adjunct professor at Boston University's College of Communications, and wrote two live-action pilots for SyFy before being recruited to develop and executive-produce Transformers: Prime for Hasbro's then-new cable co-venture with Discovery Communications, The Hub. Kline developed and was executive producer of G.I. Joe: Renegades as well before signing an exclusive four-year series development and production deal with Hasbro Studios in 2011.

He was executive producer of both Transformers: Prime and the first season of Transformers: Rescue Bots. He was an executive producer of Transformers: Robots in Disguise.

In 2013, Kline founded Darby Pop Publishing, a comic book publishing company, and entered into a distribution agreement with IDW. Darby Pop's first title, Indestructible, was created by Kline. The first issue was released in December 2013. Other Darby Pop titles include The 7th Sword, City: the Mind and the Machine, Doberman, and Dead Squad. In October 2015, Darby Pop announced a collaboration with Bruce Lee Entertainment to produce Bruce Lee: The Dragon Rises, which chronicles the return of the beloved actor, philosopher, teacher, and — of course — martial artist in a present-day, all-ages comedy/action/adventure co-written by Kline and Shannon Lee, daughter of Bruce. In January 2018, Darby Pop announced another collaboration with Bruce Lee Entertainment: Bruce Lee: The Walk of the Dragon by Nicole Dubuc (Star Wars: Rebels, My Little Pony, Transformers: Rescue Bots).

Kline's Darby Pop Productions produced Jingle Bell Rocks, a documentary about Christmas music, distributed by Oscilloscope Laboratories.

In 2018, Kline served as Executive Producer and Head Writer on a new series (10) of Woody Woodpecker animated shorts for YouTube.

Achievements 

The crew of Transformers Prime Beast Hunters has been nominated for a 2014 Daytime Emmy Award for Outstanding Special Class Animated Program for which Jeff Kline was named for his work as executive producer. Transformers Prime Beast Hunters won two Daytime Emmy Awards for Outstanding Individual Achievement in Animation: Jose Lopez for Character Design and Yasuhiro Motoda for Character Animation.

Christophe Vacher was nominated for a 2013 Annie Award for Outstanding Achievement in Production Design in an Animated TV/Broadcast Production for his work on Transformers: Prime

Transformers: Prime won three 2013 Daytime Emmy Awards for Outstanding Individual Achievement in Animation: Arato Kato for Character Animation, Jason Park for Background Design, and Kirk van Wormer for Storyboards.

The series Transformers: Prime won a 2012 Daytime Emmy Award for Outstanding Special Class Animated Program for which Jeff Kline was named for his work as executive producer.

Transformers: Prime was also nominated for six Daytime Emmys in 2011, and won two Outstanding Individual Achievement in Animation Awards for Christophe Vacher's color design and Vince Toyama's background design.

While Kline was executive producer, PBS children's series Dragon Tales was nominated for the Outstanding Children's Animated Program Daytime Emmy in 2001, 2002, and 2003. 

Kline's shows have also been nominated for Daytime Emmys in:
2007: My Friends Tigger & Pooh
2002: Jackie Chan Adventures; Harold and the Purple Crayon won for Outstanding Achievement in Main Title Design; MIB: The Animated Series won for Outstanding Sound Editing Special Class
2001: Jackie Chan Adventures, Roughnecks: Starship Troopers Chronicles
2000: MIB: The Animated Series; Roughnecks: Starship Troopers Chronicles won for Outstanding Sound Editing Special Class
1999: MIB: The Animated Series.

Jackie Chan Adventures was nominated for an Annie Award in 2003, as was Dragon Tales in 2000. Harold and the Purple Crayon was nominated for a Humanitas Prize in 2002. Max Steel was nominated for the Annie Awards in 2000 and 2001 and for Golden Reel Awards in 2001 and 2002. MIB: The Animated Series was nominated for a Kids' Choice Award in 1999 and for Golden Reel Awards in 1998, 1999, and 2002. Roughnecks: The Starship Troopers Chronicles was nominated for Golden Reel Awards in 2000 and 2001.

Kline's 2013 film Jingle Bell Rocks!, for which he was an Executive Producer, was selected for inclusion in several film festivals including the 2015 Cleveland International Film Festival and the Detroit Institute of Arts Cinetopia Film Festival. Jingle Bell Rocks! was released on DVD for Record Store Day in 2014.

Kline helped start the BU in L.A. industry exchange program. He received the Boston University College of Communication Distinguished Alumnae Award in 2003. In early 2009, Kline taught as an adjunct professor at BU's College of Communications.

Filmography

References

External links 

 "Transformers: Prime Executive Producer Jeff Kline". WCSH. May 31, 2012.

American male screenwriters
Television producers from Massachusetts
Film producers from Massachusetts
People from Boston
Year of birth missing (living people)
Living people
Screenwriters from Massachusetts